Daniel Clifford or Dan Clifford may refer to:

Dan Clifford (Holby City), a fictional character in the TV series Holby City
Dan Clifford (rubgy league), Australian rugby league player, in  Queensland Rugby League Northern Division's 2008 "Team of the Century"
Dan Clifford (theatre entrepreneur) (died 1942), Australian cinema chain owner
Daniel Clifford (chef) (born 1973), English chef
dbClifford, (born 1979), French singer